Tinhead is a platform video game developed by Microprose U.K. and published by Ballistic and Spectrum HoloByte for the Sega Genesis.

It was designed by Richard Lemarchand, with graphics and animation by Trevor Slater, John Reitze, Mark Wilson, Paul Ayliffe, Theo Pantazi, Allan Holloway and Seth Walker, programming by Jim Gardner, Nick Thompson, Paul Dunning and Chris Newcombe, and production by Stuart Whyte.

Plot 

An evil intergalactic goblin named  Grim Squidge steals all the stars from the sky with a vacuum cleaner-nosed spaceship, seals them in glass spheres and scatters them far and wide across distant planets, threatening the very infrastructure of spacetime.

On a space station far out in the distant reaches of galactic space, Tinhead, the metallic Guardian of the Edge of the Universe, picks up a distress signal from an unknown friend of the stars. Arming his head-mounted ball bearing gun, he rushes to the stars' rescue.

Release 
Ports for both the Amiga and Super Nintendo Entertainment System were in development and scheduled for 1994 but were cancelled. Former MicroProse UK employee Steve Goss stated in a 2001 forum post at AtariAge that a conversion of the game was also in development and completed for the Atari Jaguar but was never released due to low sales of the system.

Reception 
Electronic Gaming Monthly gave the game a 6.4 out of 10, commenting that the game is on the hard side but gets by due to useful power-ups and "dynamic" bosses. They cited the graphics as the highlight of the game.

References

External links 
 Tinhead at GameFAQs
 Tinhead at Giant Bomb
 Tinhead at MobyGames

1993 video games
Cancelled Amiga games
Cancelled Atari Jaguar games
MicroProse games
Piko Interactive games
Sega Genesis games
Super Nintendo Entertainment System games
Video games developed in the United Kingdom